Zorian and Zoryan are surnames of Armenian origin. People with those surnames include:

 Ashot Zorian (1905–1970), Turkish-born Egyptian painter of Armenian ethnicity
 Emilia Zoryan (active from 2011), American film actress
 Olive Zorian (19161965), English violinist
 Stepan Zorian (also known as Rostom; 18671919), Armenian political activist
 Stepan Zoryan (18891967), Soviet Armenian writer

See also 
 Zorian Quartet, a string quartet founded by Olive Zorian
 Zoryan Institute, an American non-profit organization and think tank established 1982 in Cambridge, Massachusetts

Armenian-language surnames